Lok Hin Terrace is a Home Ownership Scheme and Private Sector Participation Scheme court in Chai Wan, Hong Kong Island, Hong Kong near Walton Estate and Yue Wan Estate. Formerly the site of Block 1 to 8 of old Chai Wan Estate, it was jointly developed by the Hong Kong Housing Authority and Genius Project Development Company Limited and has a total of five residential blocks built in 1995.

Houses

Demographics
According to the 2016 by-census, Lok Hin Terrace had a population of 4,588. The median age was 48.9 and the majority of residents (94.6 per cent) were of Chinese ethnicity. The average household size was 3 people. The median monthly household income of all households (i.e. including both economically active and inactive households) was HK$35,530.

Politics
Lok Hin Terrace is located in Yue Wan constituency of the Eastern District Council. It was formerly represented by Chui Chi-kin, who was elected in the 2019 elections until May 2021.

See also

Public housing estates in Chai Wan and Siu Sai Wan

References

Chai Wan
Home Ownership Scheme
Private Sector Participation Scheme
Residential buildings completed in 1995